The Third Mind is a book by Beat Generation novelist William S. Burroughs and artist/poet/novelist Brion Gysin. First published in a French-language edition in 1977, it was published in English in 1978. It contains numerous short fiction pieces as well as poetry by Gysin, and an interview with Burroughs. Some chapters had previously been published, in slightly different form, in various literary journals between 1960 and 1973.

The book is a combination of literary essays and writing showcasing the cut-up technique popularized by Burroughs and Gysin in the 1960s. Cut-ups involves taking texts, cutting the pages, and then rearranging and combining the pieces to form new narratives. The technique was adapted for filmmaking, as demonstrated by Burroughs and director Antony Balch in their early 1960s short film, The Cut-Ups.

Contents 

 "Proclaim  Present Time  Over" (in: The Award Avant-Garde  Reader) 
 "Let  the  Mice  In" (in: Brion  Gysin Let  the  Mice  In (1973))
 "The  Cut-up Method  of  Brion  Gysin" (in: A  Casebook  on  the  Beat)  
 "Cut-ups Self-Explained,"  "Cut-ups:  A  Project  for  Disastrous  Success," and "Fold-ins" (in: Evergreen  Review)    
 "The Exterminator" (in: The  Exterminator (1960)) 
 "Formats:  The Grid" (in: Insect Trust Gazette)   
 "Films" (in: May fair)  
 "First  Cut-ups" and  "Intersection   Readings" (in: Minutes  to  Go (1960))  
 "Technical  Deposition  of  the  Virus  Power" (in: Nova  Express)  
 "Interview  with William S. Burroughs." (in: The Paris  Review) 

1977 short story collections
Essay collections by William S. Burroughs
Short story collections by William S. Burroughs
Viking Press books